Seego Hollow is a valley in southern St. Francois County in the U.S. state of Missouri.

Seego Hollow has the name of the original owner of the site.

References

Valleys of St. Francois County, Missouri
Valleys of Missouri